The 1988 Marshall Thundering Herd football team represented Marshall University as a member of the Southern Conference (SoCon) during the 1988 NCAA Division I-AA football season. Led by third-year head coach George Chaump, the Thundering Herd compiled an overall record of 11–2 with a mark of 6–1 in conference play, sharing the SoCon title with Furman. Marshall advanced to the  NCAA Division I-AA Championship playoffs, where they beat North Texas in the first round before losing to Furman in the quarterfinals.

Schedule

References

Marshall
Marshall Thundering Herd football seasons
Southern Conference football champion seasons
Marshall Thundering Herd football